Interference is the fourth album by English band Cubanate. In contrast to the band's previous releases, it incorporates drum and bass rhythms instead of regular dance beats, and the lyrics are more introspective and personal than what characterizes Cubanate's older material.

This album heavily focuses on use of the Amen Break as can be heard in "It", "Isolation", "Hinterland", "Other Voices", and "Voids".

The UK version of the album features two previously unreleased tracks, "Pleasure Kick" and "Ordinary Joe", recorded in 1996; accordingly, these tracks follow the more traditional Cubanate style.

Track listing

UK release 
 "It" – 3:11
 "Isolation" – 7:46
 "9:59" – 4:27
 "Hinterland" – 6:10
 "Ex" – 1:55
 "Internal" – 4:39
 "Other Voices" – 5:36
 "The Horsetrader" – 4:44
 "Voids" – 4:17
 "An Airport Bar" – 8:03
 "Pleasure Kick" – 5:26
 "Ordinary Joe" – 5:38
 "9:59 (Front 242 Remix)" – 5:01

US release 
 "It" – 3:11
 "Isolation" – 7:46
 "9:59" – 4:27
 "Hinterland" – 6:10
 "Ex" – 1:55
 "Internal" – 4:39
 "Other Voices" – 5:36
 "The Horsetrader" – 4:44
 "Voids" – 4:18
 "An Airport Bar" – 8:00

External links 
 [ Allmusic review of the US version]

1998 albums
Cubanate albums